Francis Gould may refer to:
 Francis Carruthers Gould, British caricaturist and political cartoonist
 Francis Gould (cricketer), English cricketer and British Army officer

See also
 Frank Jay Gould, philanthropist and son of financier Jay Gould